The Tyinirha River may identify either of two small rivers of Africa:
 
Tyinirha River, a tributary of the Mzimvubu River in Eastern Cape province, South Africa that formed one of the former boundaries of East Griqualand in the 1860s and 70s.
Kinira River, a stream in Nigeria